Peter Reulein (born 1966) is a German composer, organ improviser, academic teacher and church musician, from 2000 at the church Liebfrauen in Frankfurt am Main. In 2016 he composed for the Catholic Diocese of Limburg the Franciscan oratorio Laudato si'.

Career 
Born in Frankfurt am Main, Reulein studied Catholic church music at the Hochschule für Musik und Darstellende Kunst Frankfurt am Main with Wolfgang Schäfer and Uwe Gronostay. After extended studies of organ improvisation with Daniel Roth in Paris, he won several national and international competitions in this field, for example in 1993 the competition of Belgian radio and the second prize and the public's prize at the Festival Europäische Kirchenmusik in Schwäbisch Gmünd. He continued his studies of interpretations with Ludger Lohmann, Ewald Kooiman and Wolfgang Rübsam. He took master classes with choral conductors such as Eric Ericson and Helmuth Rilling.

From 1991, Reulein was the church musician at the Heilig Geist in Frankfurt-Riederwald, from 2000 he has held the position at Liebfrauen in the centre of Frankfurt. There he directs a vocal ensemble, the choir Collegium Vocale, the orchestra Collegium Musicum and the youth choir Capuccinis. He was instrumental in having a new organ built which  completed in 2008. Reulein inaugurated it in a concert on 9 August, playing works by Bach, César Franck and improvisation.

Reulein is known for composing new songs for church services, many of them on texts by Eugen Eckert. Reulein was from 2000 until 2005 the head of the Arbeitskreis Kirchenmusik und Jugendseelsorge im Bistum Limburg, caring about more appropriate church music for young people. Reulein has been an instructor of liturgical organ playing and improvisation at the Frankfurt Hochschule für Musik und Darstellende Kunst from 2002. He was appointed  (regional cantor) for Frankfurt in 2008.

In 2014, Reulein recorded at Liebfrauen a CD of Französische Orgelsymphonik (French symphonic organ music) with works by Léon Boëllmann, Camille Saint-Saëns, Alexandre Guilmant and Charles-Marie Widor.

He was commissioned to compose an oratorio to celebrate in 2016 the 50th anniversary of church music in the Catholic Diocese of Limburg, presenting different styles of church music. The text by Helmut Schlegel, titled Laudato si' – Ein franziskanisches Magnificat (A Franciscan Magnificat) includes the Latin Magnificat, writings by Francis of Assisi and Clare of Assisi, writings by Pope Francis from the German version of Laudato si' to German, and other sacred texts. Reulein scored the work for five soloists, children's choir, Choralschola, mixed choir, organ and orchestra. It was published by the Dehm-Verlag in Limburg in 2016 and first performed in the Limburg Cathedral on 6 November 2016, conducted by the composer.

Works 
 Wir haben seinen Stern gesehen, text: Eugen Eckert
 Dich will ich loben allezeit, 1994, text: Eugen Eckert
 Laß dich anstecken zum Jubel, 1994, text: Eugen Eckert
 "Jesus Christus, Sohn des Lebens", 1994, text: Eugen Eckert
 Gott, dein guter Geist, 1994, text: Eugen Eckert
 Heilig, heilig, Hosanna guter Gott, 1994
 Dich, Gott, will ich erheben, 1999, text: Eugen Eckert
 Dir, Gott, du unsere Stärke, 1999, text: Eugen Eckert
 Was sagst du, Gott, zu dieser Welt?, 1999, Text: Eugen Eckert
 Jesus, Gottes Lamm, 1999, text: Eugen Eckert
 Die Zeit färben, 1999, text: Eugen Eckert
 Seht, Brot und Wein, 1999, text: Eugen Eckert
 Vereinigungslied der Deutschen Kapuziner, text: Bernhard Philipp, 2010
 
 Eins, oratorio, 2021 for the Ökumenischer Kirchentag 2021 in Frankfurt

References

External links 
 Musik und Kunst (in German) Music and art at Liebfrauen Frankfurt
 Peter Reulein Carus-Verlag
 Oratorium Laudato si' / Ein franziskanisches Magnificat in 5 Bildern – Für Soli, Chor und Orchester Dehm-Verlag

1966 births
20th-century classical composers
20th-century German composers
20th-century German conductors (music)
20th-century German male musicians
20th-century organists
21st-century classical composers
21st-century German composers
21st-century German conductors (music)
21st-century German male musicians
21st-century organists
Composers of Christian music
Frankfurt University of Music and Performing Arts alumni
Academic staff of the Frankfurt University of Music and Performing Arts
German choral conductors
German classical composers
German classical organists
German male classical composers
German male conductors (music)
German male organists
Living people
Male classical organists
Musicians from Frankfurt
Oratorio composers